Human sexual promiscuity is the practice of having many different sexual partners. In the case of men, this behavior of sexual nondiscrimination and hypersexuality is referred to as satyriasis, while in the case of women, this behavior is conventionally known as nymphomania. Both conditions are regarded as possibly compulsive and pathological qualities, closely related to hyper-sexuality. The results of, or costs associated with, these behaviors are the effects of human sexual promiscuity.

A high number of sexual partners in a person's life usually means they are at a higher risk of sexually transmitted infections and life-threatening cancers. These costs largely pertain to the dramatic consequences to physical and mental health. The physical health risks mainly consist of the sexually transmitted disease risks, such as HIV and AIDS, that increase as individuals have develop sexual partners over their lifetime. The mental health risks typically associated with promiscuous individuals are mood, and personality disorders, often resulting in substance use disorders and, or permanent illness. These effects typically translate into several other long-term issues in people's lives and in their relationships, especially in the case of adolescents or those with previous pathological illnesses, disorders, or factors such as family dysfunction and social stress.

There are however several benefits to promiscuity in both humans and animals.

Promiscuity in adolescents 

The prevalence of promiscuity, in the case of adolescents, is known to be a root cause for many physical, mental, and socio-economic risks. Research has found that adolescents, in particular, are at a higher risk of negative consequences as a result of promiscuity.

In sub-Saharan Africa, adolescents engaged in promiscuous activities face many health and economic risks related to teenage pregnancy, maternal mortality, labor complications, and loss of educational opportunities.

It is suggested that the increasing association of sexually transmitted diseases among adolescents could be a result of barriers to prevention and management services, such as infrastructural barriers (improper medical treatment facilities), cost barriers, educational barriers, and social factors such as concerns of confidentiality and embarrassment.

Physical health effects 
Incidence and prevalence estimates suggest that adolescents, in comparison to adults, are particularly at higher risk of developing sexually transmitted diseases, such as chlamydia, gonorrhea, syphilis and herpes. It is accepted that adolescent females are especially at risk to develop sexually-transmitted infections. This is claimed to be due to the increased cervical ectopy, which is more susceptible to infection. In addition to these risks, adolescent mothers, whose offspring are generally first-births, are at a higher risk of certain pregnancy and labor complications, which can affect the mother and the offspring, as well as the entire community and future generations.

Pregnancy and maternal labor complications 
It has been found that pregnancy-related complications cause up to half of all deaths in women of reproductive age in developing countries. In some areas, for every one woman who dies a maternal death, there are 10-15 who suffer severe damage to health by labor, which often causes substantial mental health risks and distress. These figures, however, are estimations since official data is not recorded in registration systems. In the context of pregnancy, maternal complications, and maternal death, it has been studied that age itself may cause fewer health risks for the mother or the offspring due to the prevalence of first-births among the younger ages. First births are higher among teenagers and are usually more complicated than higher-order births. Included in these observations are other complications related to delivery such as cephalopelvic disproportion, which is a condition in which the mother's pelvis is too small relative to the child's head to allow the child to pass. Cephalopelvis disproportion is most common in younger women. Many of these risks are higher among younger females, and a more mature physique is considered to be ideal for a successful pregnancy and childbearing. A mother older than 35 years old, however, may at a higher risk of facing various other labor complications.

In a study of over 22,000 births in Zaria, Nigeria, it was found that maternal mortality was 2-3 times higher for women 15 years old and under than for women from 16–29 years old. It was also found that in Africa, those under the age of 15 are 5-7 times more likely to have maternal deaths than women just 5–9 years older.

Sexually transmitted infections 
While rates of these sexually transmitted infections increased for 15-24 year-old individuals in the United States for both males and females in 2016–2017, the rates of chlamydia are found to be consistently highest among 15-24 year-old young women. Reported cases of primary and secondary syphilis have consistently been higher among adolescent men and women compared to adult men and women. In the United States in 2017, there were 1,069,111 reported cases of chlamydia among persons aged 15–25, which represented the majority, almost 63%, of all chlamydia cases in the United States. These figures increased by 7.5% from 2016 in the 15-25 age group. In the 20-24 age group, the rate was increased by 5.0% during the same time frame. Among men in the 15-24 age group, there was an increase of 8.9% in 2017 since 2016 and an increase of 29.1% since 2013.

Gonorrhea infection cases were also reported to have increased for the 15-19 year age group in 2017 since 2016. In the case of women aged 15–24, there was an increase of 14.3% in 2017 since 2016, and a 24.1% increase since 2013. Among men, the rate of reported gonorrhea infections rose 13.4% in 2017 since 2016 and 51.6% since 2013. 20-24-year-old women had the highest increase in reported cases of gonorrhea among women, and the 15-19 year old age group had the second highest rate of increase.

While cases of primary and secondary syphilis is much rarer than gonorrhea, chlamydia, and herpes, the reported cases had increased for both males and females. In 15-24-year-old women, the cases of syphilis had increased 7.8% in 2017 since 2016 and increased 83.3% since 2013. In the case of 15-24-year-old men, the rate increased 8.3% to 26.1 cases per 100,000 males in 2017 since 2016 and 50.9% since 2013. Primary and secondary syphilis reports increased 9.8% for the 15-19 year age group and 7.8% for the 20-24 year age group from 2016 to 2017.

In the United States, Human papillomavirus is the most common STI. Routine use of HPV vaccines have greatly reduced the prevalence of HPV in specimens of females aged 14–19 and 20–24, the age group most at risk of contracting HPV, in 2011-2014 since 2003–2006.

Mental health effects 
Emotional and mental disruptions are also observed to be an effect of the promiscuity in adolescence. Studies have shown a correlation and direct relationship between adolescent sexual risk taking and mental health risks. Sexual risks include multiple sexual partners, lack of protection use, and sexual intercourse at a young age. The mental risks that are associated with these include cognitive disorders such as anxiety, depression, and a substance use disorder. It is also found that sexual promiscuity in teens can be a result of substance misuse and pre-existing mental health conditions such as clinical depression.

In relation to the contraction of sexually transmitted diseases, there is shown to be a correlation to decreased mental health.  The neurosyphilis disease is known to cause extreme depression, mania, psychosis, and even hallucinations in late stages of the diseases. The chlamydia infection is known to increase rates of depression even in asymptomatic individuals.

STDs can put women at a high risk for infertility, which generally leads to feelings of depression.  This holds true for women who are still able to conceive because there is a high risk of transferring the disease to their child through pregnancy or child birth.

Women in generally are of higher susceptibility to psychosocial mental health effects of STIs.  They report to having feelings immense of shame, guilt, and self blame after diagnosis.  This can lead to avoidant behaviors and fear of disclosure to not only sexual partners but family and friends.  All of these behaviors are associated with a decline to mental health, whether it is depression, anxiety, or any other disorder.

Other factors contribute to how STDs effect mental health and these include history of trauma and stigma from the disease.

Socio and economic effects 
Sexual risk-taking and promiscuous activities, in regards to the youth, can also lead to many social and economic risks. In sub-Saharan Africa, for example, research has found that teenage pregnancy poses significant social and economic risks, as it forces young women, particularly those from extremely low-income families, to leave school to pursue childbearing. These disruptions in basic education pose life-long and generational risks to those involved. Social condemnation also prevents these young mothers from seeking help, and as a result are at a higher risk for developing other physical and mental risks, which can later result in physical health risks and substance use.

Promiscuity in adults 
Sexual promiscuity in adults, as with adolescents, presents substantial risks to physical, mental, and socioeconomic health. Having multiple sexual partners is linked with risks such as maternal deaths and complications, cancers, sexually transmitted infections, alcohol, and substance use, and social condemnation in some societies. A higher number of sexual partners poses a greater risk of contracting sexually transmitted diseases, mental health issues, and alcohol/substance use. Adults, however, are generally found to be less at risk of certain pregnancy and labor complications, such as cephalopelvis disproportion, than adolescents, while being at higher risk for other labor complications.

Physical health effects 
Promiscuity in adults has detrimental effects on physical health. As the number of sexual partners a person has in his or her lifetime increases, the higher the risk he or she contracts sexually transmitted diseases. The length of a sexual relationship with a partner, the number of past and present partners, and pre-existing conditions are all variables that affect the development of risks in a person's life. Promiscuous individuals may also be at a higher risk of developing prostate cancer, cervical cancer, and oral cancer as a result of having multiple sexual partners, and combined with other risky acts such as smoking, and substance use, promiscuity can also lead to heart disease.

Despite the frequency of HIV/AIDS cases decreasing as medical treatment and education on the matter improve, HIV/AIDS has still been responsible for over 20 million lives in 20 years, greatly affecting the livelihoods of whole communities in developing nations. According to the World Health Organization, over 40 million people are currently infected with HIV/AIDS, and 95% of these cases are in the developing world.

Over 340 million treatable sexually transmitted diseases infect people around the world each year, which presents a great risk to individuals as they become more susceptible to HIV and more likely to spread the virus.

Studies have also shown that individuals who engage in long-term relationships, as opposed to hypersexual and promiscuous behavior are less likely to fall victim to domestic violence.

Mental health effects 
While some studies claim that the number of sexual partners is directly correlated with mental health disorders, others find that promiscuity only results in substance use with no effect on depression or anxiety. According to research conducted by Sandhya Ramrakha of the Dunedin School of Medicine, the probability of developing a substance use disorder increased linearly with an increase in the number of sexual partners. This was particularly greater for women, however, there was no correlation with other mental health risks. This contrasts other studies that find there indeed is a correlation between mental health risk and multiple sexual partners.

Social and economic effects 
Having multiple sexual partners frequently adversely affects educational opportunities for young women, which can affect their careers and opportunities as adults; the frequency of multiple sexual partners have negative long-term economic effects for women as a result of a loss of schooling. There is little evidence, however, that the number of sexual partners adversely affects the educational and economic opportunities for males.

Reducing the effects 
Human sexual promiscuity presents substantial physical, mental, and socio-economic risks to adolescents as well as adults in all parts of the world. Researchers and organizations have identified ways of reducing these risks over time. These include the prevention and treatment of sexually transmitted infections and other effects of human sexual promiscuity.

Prevention 
According to the World Health Organization, the reduction in the harmful risks of human sexual promiscuity can be achieved first by prevention. These are sustained through HIV and STI prevention programs, defined in the Declaration of Commitment during the United Nations General Assembly on HIV/AIDS in June 2001. Safe sex, condom and contraceptive usage and effectual STI management are essential in preventing the spread of these sexually transmitted infections, and it can also improve the social and economic status of entire communities as young women can pursue education instead of childbearing. At a large enough scale with a target on STI concentrated locations with high rates of STIs, these programs can greatly reduce the effects of promiscuity.

Treatment 
Many of these lower-income areas lack proper equipment or facilities to treat these risks. Expansion of antiretroviral treatment and the enabling of broader access to all medical services and support can be paramount in the treatment of sexually transmitted infections once they occur. For the mental health risks that human sexual promiscuity presents, effective counseling services, and facilities must be offered, enabling the reduction of these risks over time.

References 

Human sexuality
Promiscuity